Plumbago europaea, also known as the common leadwort, is a plant species in the genus Plumbago found in the Mediterranean Basin and Central Asia.

Plumbago europaea produces the flavonol europetin.

References

External links

europaea
Flora of Europe
Flora of Central Asia
Flora of Western Asia
Plants described in 1753
Taxa named by Carl Linnaeus